Wyatt Wheaton Anderson (born March 27, 1939) is an American geneticist and evolutionary biologist. He is Alumni Foundation Distinguished Professor Emeritus in the Department of Genetics in the University of Georgia's Franklin College of Arts and Sciences. He was also the dean of the Franklin College of Arts and Sciences from 1992 until he stepped down in 2004. He has been a member of the National Academy of Sciences since 1987, and is also a fellow of the American Academy of Arts and Sciences and the American Association for the Advancement of Science.

Research
Anderson is known for his research on the evolutionary genetics of Drosophila. In 2012, for example, he co-authored a study with Patricia Adair Gowaty and Yong-Kyu Kim in which they attempted, and failed, to replicate a famous 1948 study by Angus John Bateman. Their results indicated that Bateman was wrong in his conclusions that male Drosophila melanogaster were promiscuous and females were more "choosy" with regard to their mating behaviors.

Personal life
Anderson is married to Margaret Anderson, a statistician with whom he co-founded the  Wyatt and Margaret Anderson Professorship in the Arts at UGA. The first recipient of this professorship was Frederick Burchinal in 2006. Together, they have 3 children and 4 grandchildren

References

External links
Faculty page

American geneticists
Living people
Members of the United States National Academy of Sciences
University of Georgia faculty
Rockefeller University alumni
Evolutionary biologists
Fellows of the American Academy of Arts and Sciences
Fellows of the American Association for the Advancement of Science
21st-century American biologists
1939 births
Scientists from New Orleans